Happy Ghost II (Chinese: 開心鬼放暑假) is a 1985 Hong Kong comedy film directed by Clifton Ko. Produced and written by Raymond Wong, the film stars Wong, Fennie Yuan, May Lo, Charine Chan and Gigi Fu. This film is the sequel to Happy Ghost. Although the film grossed less than its prequel, it was the 10th most grossing film in Hong Kong that year. The film is about Happy Ghost / Scholar Stewart Pik (Raymond Wong Pak-ming) gets reincarnated and is now a high school teacher called Hong Sam Kwai, born with natural superpowers but doesn't know how to use them. He is assigned to teach a class full of naughty students who likes to play pranks. He becomes a victim of his students, but with the help of a school worker (Kee-Chan Tang), he knows how to avoid the pranks. Some boys from a boy school nearby falls in love with Kwai's students and Kwai falls in love with the boys' class teacher.

Cast 

 Raymond Wong Pak-ming as Steward Pik (朱錦春) - The Happy Ghost 
 Raymond Wong Pak-ming as Hong Sam-Kwai (康森貴) - High school teacher, Steward Pik's afterlife
 Fennie Yuen as Thai Chek-Yee (戴卓儀) - High school student, arrogant
 May Lo as May Ken (簡靜美) - High school student, love snacks
 Charine Chan as Yiu-King (姚瓊) - High school student, has a crush on Sam-Kwai
 Gigi Fu as Akina (趙明菜) - High school student, loves to dress up
 Jeanne Kanai as Miss Lo (老老師) - Works at a boy's high school
 Kee-Chan Tang as Uncle Tang (鄧伯) - High school canteen worker
 Chuen Hau Lee as Michael Jackson Ko (高帶水) - High school student, has a crush on Chek-Yee
 Kong-Yin Wong as Pan Zai-An (潘再安) - High school student, has a crush on Akina
 Hung-Cheung Leung as Paul Chan - High school student, has a crush on May 
 Man-No Chen as Headmistress - Has a crush on Sam-Kwai
 Kwong Lam Tsui as Deputy headmaster Chu - Snobbish
 Melvin Wong as Rival coach - High school teacher, Sam-Kwai's rival in love
 Gigi Lai as High school student 
 Clifton Ko as Diving judge (cameo)

Release 
Happy Ghost was a hit for Cinema City and grossed a total of HK$16,602,480. The movie ran in theaters from 18 July 1985 to 7 August 1985. In the Malaysia, the film was launched on TV3 called as Cinema programme slot aired on Friday, 25 November 2022 at 10pm until 11:59pm MST in Cantonese dubbed and Malay subtitle.

See also
Clifton Ko filmography
List of Hong Kong films of 1985

References

External links

1980s Cantonese-language films
1985 comedy films
1985 films
Hong Kong comedy films
1980s ghost films
Hong Kong ghost films
Films directed by Clifton Ko
1980s Hong Kong films